is a Japanese mecha animated series produced by Sunrise and Asatsu-DK, created and directed by Oji Hiroi (Sakura Wars, Far East of Eden) and written by Shūji Iuchi (Mashin Hero Wataru). It aired in NTV from April 7, 1989 to March 2, 1990. It spawned three special direct-to-video episodes and two Original Video Animation movies, as well as a video game for the PC Engine SuperGrafx.

Plot
In 2050, the moon was mysteriously terraformed after a great moonquake, giving it Earth-like gravity and breathable air. Fifty years later, the moon is now populated with humans and has become a popular tourist destination. After a boy named Daichi arrives on the moon for summer vacation, he accidentally meets an old witch, V-Mei, and her granddaughter Guri Guri. Both of them are members of the endangered Long-Ears race, currently at war with the evil Jadou Clan, who are also planning to take over Earth. V-Mei gives a magic gun to Daichi and reveals that he is the chosen Madou Warrior destined to save the Long-Ears race and their land Rabiluna from the Jadou Clan.

With the magic gun, Daichi can summon Granzort, a giant robot called a Madou King with the elemental power of Earth, to fight against the monsters of the Jadou Clan. During their travels, Daichi, V-Mei, and Guru Guri are later joined by two other Madou Warriors, Gus and Rabi. Gus's magic bow summons Winzart, the Madou King of Wind, while Rabi's magic top summons Aquabeat, the Madou King of Water.

Theme Songs

Opening
"Hikari no Senshi-tachi (Soldiers of Light)" by Kenji Suzuki
Lyrics: You and Hisa Araki, Composer: Yukihide Takekawa, Arranger: Yamamoto Takeshi

Ending
"Horore chuchu parero" by Tomoko Tokugaki
Lyrics: You and Hisa Araki, Composition: Kosugi Yasuo, Arrangement: Yamamoto Takeshi

Staff 

Planning: Sunrise
Written by: Hajime Yatate Prince Hiroi
Planning Cooperation: Red Company
Character Design: Studio Live
Mechanical design: Ookawara Kunio
Art Director: Ikeda Shigemi
Director of Photography: Okui Atsushi
Music: Tadashi Tadashi Tanaka
General Director: Iuti Hideharu
Producer: Itou Symphony, Yuko Sagawa, Yoshii Takayuki, Masayuki Tomita people
Guest Character Design: Ashida Toyoo, Yoshimatsu Takahiro, Uesugi Emiko
Guest Mechanical Design: Hiroshi Fuji
Original: live studio, production Nakamura, mu studio, animation ares, House Lust, GA studio, studio tan huh mark studio, studio plotting only
Video: plotting only studio, Studio MAX, Chimumu project, wombats, Eyume studio, studio mark, nine studio magic, ECHO, Studio G7, the last house, the group ZEN, anime romance, Nakamura Production
Check Videos: Aya Yoshi priest, Etsushi forest and Kazuhiko Komori, Nagasaki Takaharu, Kanno Toshiyuki
Color Design: Uemura Ayako
Coloring: Takeshi Mochida, Tiba Kenzi, Nozaki Kinuyo, Takiguti Yoshiko, Masashi Nitta, Matsushita Kumiko, Rieko Tanaka, Sanae Hukada
Special Effects: Isono Matsuko, Shibata Mutsuko, Komori Yasuhiko, Yamamoto Hiroshi
Finish: Studio DEEN, bogey studio, Studio G7, nine studio magic, just
Backgrounds: Atelier Musa, the modern mass production, green
Photographer: Asahi Production, trans arts, reefs
Sound Production: Tida Keiko
Effect: Yasushi Aya Yoda, Kageyama Minoru
Adjustment: Yoda Yoshiaki
Recording Studio: voicing
Symptoms: Toukyou processing station
Editor: Yumiko Fabrics
Titles: Maki Pro
Setting Cooperation: Sum Asahina Shiyou, two trillion Yoshikawa
Production Cooperation: Studio Devil nine studios, G7
Production Progress: Murakoshi Hideo, Yoshimura Akira, Manda Toshiya City, Miyagi Shinzi, Ida Kazuyuki, Ryota Yamaguchi, Sakamoto Masatoshi, Igarashi Takuya Yusuke Yamamoto, Matsuda Yoshiaki, Y. Oohashi Tie
Production Setup: Sato Sumiko
PR: Yamaguti Susumu, Susumu Iwakami joy, Suzuki Yasuko
Production Desk: Manda Toshiya City, Miyashita Masako
Production Planning: NTV
Production: ASATSU, Sunrise

References

External links
Bandai Channel's Mado King Granzort page 
Studio Live page 

GURI! A Madou-King Granzort Site

1989 anime television series debuts
Adventure anime and manga
Nippon TV original programming
Medialink
Oji Hiroi
Sunrise (company)
Bandai Namco franchises
Super robot anime and manga